The Big South Conference women's basketball tournament is the conference championship tournament in women's basketball for the Big South Conference. It is a single-elimination tournament involving all of the 10 league schools, and seeding is based on regular-season records with head-to-head match-up as a tie-breaker. The winner receives the conference's automatic bid to the NCAA women's basketball tournament.

In the first round, the #7 seed faces off against the #10 and the #8 faces off against the #9. The #1 and #2 seeds play the winner of those games in the quarterfinals, while the #3 seed faces off against the #6 seed and the #4 seed faces off against the #5 seed.

The tournament has been held since 1986.

Results

Champions

 Charleston Southern, Presbyterian, and USC Upstate have not yet won a Big South tournament.
 Armstrong State, Augusta State, Birmingham-Southern, Davidson, Elon, Hampton, North Carolina A&T, Towson, UMBC, and UNC Greensboro never won the tournament as Big South members.
 Schools highlighted in pink are former Big South members.

See also
Big South Conference men's basketball tournament

References

 
Recurring sporting events established in 1986